Thiago Marin Martir or simply Thiago Marin (born November 3, 1984 in Itaquera), is a Brazilian attacking midfielder. He currently plays for Caldense.

Honours
Rio de Janeiro's Cup: 2007, 2008

External links
 
 

1984 births
Living people
Brazilian footballers
Club Athletico Paranaense players
Associação Portuguesa Londrinense players
Operário Futebol Clube (MS) players
Botafogo de Futebol e Regatas players
Itumbiara Esporte Clube players
Clube Náutico Capibaribe players
Vila Nova Futebol Clube players
Brazilian expatriate footballers
Expatriate footballers in Greece
Brazilian expatriate sportspeople in Greece
Expatriate footballers in Bahrain
Association football midfielders